Marinus may refer to:

Marinus (crater), a crater on the Moon
Marinus (given name), for people named Marinus
Dr. Marinus, a recurring character in the novels of David Mitchell

See also
The Keys of Marinus, a serial in the Doctor Who TV series